Miss Vietnam (Vietnamese: Hoa hậu Việt Nam, formerly Hoa hậu Toàn quốc Báo Tiền phong until 2000) is a beauty contest in Vietnam that has been held biennially since 1988. Along with Miss Universe Vietnam and Miss World Vietnam, Miss Vietnam is one of the Big Three national beauty pageants. 

This contest was initiated and organized by Tiền Phong Newspaper and Sen Vàng Productions. The pageant crowned the Vietnam representatives to compete in two of the major international beauty pageants: Miss World and Miss International (alternate with Miss World Vietnam). 

The current Miss Vietnam titleholder is Huỳnh Thị Thanh Thủy from Da Nang, who was crowned on December 23, 2022 in Ho Chi Minh City.

History
Miss Vietnam is the biggest beauty pageant and the first nationwide beauty contest after the unification of Vietnam. Before that, there was also a South Vietnamese Saigon-based beauty contest named Miss Vietnam and Miss Vietnam 1955 Công Thị Nghĩa became the first titleholder of the contest as well as the first national beauty pageant titleholder in Vietnamese history. The after-unification contest Miss Vietnam was initiated and organized by Tien Phong newspaper, called "Miss Tien Phong Newspaper", starting from 1988 and is held every two years. The first person to hold the title is Bùi Bích Phương. The contest was officially renamed as "Miss Vietnam" in 2002.

While Tiền Phong did not hold franchise licenses to send representatives to international beauty pageants, from 2002 to 2006, Miss Vietnam winners represented Vietnam at Miss World. In 2008, due to her incomplete high school education, Trần Thị Thùy Dung was not sent to Miss World 2008 and two Runners-up also weren't be allowed to take place. Since then, no Miss Vietnam titleholders have participated in the international pageant, including Đặng Thị Ngọc Hân, Đặng Thu Thảo and Nguyễn Cao Kỳ Duyên. However, Miss Vietnam 2010 first runner up Vũ Thị Hoàng My was appointed to represent Vietnam at both Miss Universe 2011 in São Paulo, Brazil and Miss World 2012 in Ordos, China. 

From 2014, Sen Vàng Productions became involved in the production of Miss Vietnam along with Tien Phong Newspaper. In 2017, they partnered with Elite Vietnam to secure licenses to send Miss Vietnam winners to various international pageants. Under this partnership, Miss Vietnam titleholder will participate in Miss World. The first and second runner-ups may be chosen to participate in Miss International. At Miss World 2017, Đỗ Mỹ Linh became the first Miss Vietnam titleholder since Mai Phương Thúy in 2006 to represent the country at the pageant. In 2018, the 2nd runner-up that year Nguyễn Thị Thúy An was initially appointed to participate in Miss International 2018 but she withdrew due to health issues. The contestant with the next highest score in the Top 5 Nguyễn Thúc Thùy Tiên assumed Thúy An's spot at the competition.

In 2022, the contest is confirmed to take place from October 29, 2022 to December 23, 2022. The winner of this year's contest will get to attend either Miss World or Miss International.

Titleholders

Regional rankings 

Red River Delta: 9 (Hanoi, Haiphong, Nam Định)
Southeast: 4 (Ho Chi Minh City)
South Central Coast: 3 (Đà Nẵng, Quảng Nam)
Mekong Delta: 1 (Bạc Liêu)
North Central Coast: 1 (Thanh Hóa)

Miss Vietnam at Big Four pageants representatives
Vietnam has been represented in the Big Four international beauty pageants, the four major international beauty pageants for women. These are Miss World, Miss Universe, Miss International, and Miss Earth.
Color keys

Miss World

Miss International

Representatives at other international pageants 
Color keys

Miss Grand International

Miss Intercontinental

Past Franchises

Miss Universe

Miss Earth

Notes 

All 3 Misses Vietnam in 2002, 2004 and 2006 arrived late at Miss World since the Miss Vietnam contest was held too close to Miss World. 
Phạm Thị Mai Phương is the first Miss Vietnam to get into the semifinal round at Miss World.

See also 

 Miss Universe Vietnam
 Miss World Vietnam
 Miss Earth Vietnam
 Miss Grand Vietnam
 Miss Supranational Vietnam
 Miss Vietnamese World
 Mister Vietnam
 Vietnam at major beauty pageants

References

External links
Miss Vietnam on newspaper covers

Miss Vietnam winners
Beauty pageants in Vietnam
Recurring events established in 1988
Vietnamese awards